Transformers: The Last Knight (Music from the Motion Picture) is a soundtrack album for the 2017 film of the same name. The score was written by Steve Jablonsky who composed the scores for the previous four films in the series.

Track listing
Various tracks in the score reprise themes that Jablonsky wrote for the previous films. The score also features several suites, including "Purity of Heart" and "Stay and Fight". Jablonsky also reused the track "Have Faith Prime", a piece he composed for Age of Extinction; this track isn't included in the score.

In an interview, Jablonsky spoke of the unusual length of the soundtrack, citing that much of his work in the film was cut up in the editing process. As a result, he chose to release a longer score that featured much of his original, unedited music for the film. Some tracks, such as "Sacrifice" and "We Have to Go", were heavily edited for the film, while the score's version of said tracks are unedited suites. For instance, the "Sacrifice" suite runs at seven minutes, but was cut down to three minutes in the film. In addition, the "Merlin's Staff" suite, which is six minutes long, was cut down to a thirty-second piece in the film. The "Quintessa" suite was cut apart into at least nine small tracks in the film.

The film's complete score (containing 83 tracks, including unreleased tracks as well as film versions of tracks found on the standard album) was released by Paramount Pictures in January 2018, as part of their "For Your Consideration" campaign. The tracks in the complete score are accurate to how they are heard in the film, with various tracks (such as 'Drone Chase') being cut into multiple parts in order to better match their use in the film. Several of the tracks also overlap with each other.

Complete Score Tracklist

 Features music from previous films

Charts

References

External links
 Official Movie Website

Last Knight – Music from the Motion Picture
2017 soundtrack albums
2010s film soundtrack albums
Film scores